Fred Child (born March 30, 1963) is an American radio host. Since 2000, he has been the host of the classical music radio program Performance Today on American Public Media. He is also the announcer and commentator for the PBS program Live from Lincoln Center.

Early life and education
Child was born in Huntsville, Alabama. He moved to Portland, Oregon, while still a young child, and began studying classical piano. He attended Oregon State University, where he was first exposed to radio work while hosting a jazz program on the student-run campus radio station.

Career
After graduation from university, Child was host, announcer, producer, and programmer for Oregon Public Broadcasting for ten years, including five years (1990–94) on his two-hour weekend program of World Music called Music Confluence. Child then moved to New York City and worked at WNYC, where he became music director, director of cultural programming, and also host of the program Around New York. He worked at WNYC until 2000, when he was chosen to replace Martin Goldsmith as host of Performance Today, when Goldsmith stepped down to pursue writing.

In addition to Performance Today, Child is the host of NPR's Creators @ Carnegie; a contributor to NPR's All Things Considered; and a host for live broadcasts of important concert events from New York City, Los Angeles, and London. He also appears on-stage doing pre-concert talks for the Baltimore Symphony Orchestra, New York's Lincoln Center, the Aspen Music Festival, and the Washington Performing Arts Society.

Child is also a keen musician, playing the piano, guitar, marimba, and bagpipes. His group, Balafón Marimba Ensemble, once opened for the Grateful Dead at Oakland Coliseum.

Personal life
In 2016, Child married Chinese-American composer Wang Jie.

Discography
Balafón Marimba Ensemble, Shanachie Records 67002 (1990) (as guest artist)

Notes

References
Phillips, Lisa. "At Home on the Air: Fred Child." In Public Radio: Behind the Voices. Vanguard Press, 2006. pp. 295–300.

External links
Biography at the Performance Today website
Profile at WXQR

American radio personalities
Classical music radio presenters
NPR personalities
American Public Media
Radio personalities from Oregon
Musicians from Alabama
People from Huntsville, Alabama
Musicians from Portland, Oregon
1963 births
Living people